Chris Hammer (born in 1960) is a bestselling Australian crime-writer and journalist.

He is the author of the Martin Scarsden series of novels that have been bestsellers in several countries. Hammer has a 30-year career as a journalist and has worked for The Bulletin, Fairfax and on the SBS program, Dateline. When writing his crime novels he allows the story to develop, rather than plotting it out in advance.

He won the ACT Book of the Year in 2011 for his non-fiction book, The River. His first novel, Scrublands, won the John Creasey Award at the UK Crime Writers' Association Dagger Awards in 2019.

Bibliography

Martin Scarsden series
 Scrublands (2018)
 Silver (2019)
 Trust (2020)

Standalone novels
 Treasure and Dirt (2021) (also published as Opal Country (UK))

Non-fiction
 The River (2010)
 The Coast (2012)

References

External links 

 

Australian journalists
1960 births
Living people
Australian crime writers
Australian non-fiction writers
21st-century Australian writers